Lazarevskoe Cemetery, part of the Alexander Nevsky Lavra in the centre of Saint Petersburg, is the oldest surviving cemetery in the city and contains a large number of burials as well as monuments and memorials to notable figures in Russian Imperial history.

Burials began in 1717 when Natalya Alexeyevna, the sister of Peter the Great, was interred in the burial vault of the Church of St Lazarus, from which the cemetery took its name.
   During the early years of its existence, it required the Emperor's permission to allow burials in the cemetery, making it the chosen location for the burial plots of St Petersburg's elite. By the end of the eighteenth century burial was extended to the wealthy merchant class, in exchange for the payment of large sums of money.

By the nineteenth century, the cemetery was becoming overcrowded, and the first of the new cemeteries in the Lavra, the Tikhvin Cemetery, was opened in 1823. Burials in the Lazarevskoe Cemetery became less frequent in the nineteenth century, and in the twentieth century occurred in only exceptional cases. One of the last people to be interred was Count Sergei Witte in 1915, and in 1919 the cemetery was closed to new burials.

During the Soviet period the cemetery was closed and placed under state protection, administered by the society "Old Petersburg". Redevelopment work in the Soviet period involved clearing away those memorials thought to have low historical or artistic interest, while those considered to have higher historical or artistic interest were brought from other cemeteries across the city. Large scale restoration work was carried out after the ending of the Siege of Leningrad, with the museum opening to the public in 1952.

Containing a large number of famous burials and elaborate funerary sculpture from some of the country's leading artists, the cemetery has been called the Necropolis of the XVIII century. Examples of the work of Ivan Martos, Mikhail Kozlovsky, Vasily Demut-Malinovsky, Andrey Voronikhin, Fedot Shubin, Fyodor Tolstoy and other masters can be seen. Famous people interred in the cemetery include early associates of Peter the Great, such as Field Marshal Boris Sheremetev, General Adam Veyde, and Court Physician Robert Erskine. The graves of academics Mikhail Lomonosov and Stepan Krasheninnikov; playwrights Denis Fonvizin and Yakov Knyazhnin; architects Ivan Starov, and Andrey Voronikhin; statesmen and politicians Alexander Stroganov, Nikolay Mordvinov, Mikhail Muravyov-Vilensky and Sergei Witte; and military officers such as Vasily Chichagov are also to be seen.  The family vaults of the Beloselsky-Belozersky, Trubetskoy, Volkonsky and Naryshkin ancient noble houses were located here, as were those of some of the prominent merchant dynasties such as the Demidovs and Yakovlevs. Art historian  wrote "It was as if all those who had once formed a close circle of court society gathered here after death. A whole epoch, a whole world of obsolete ideas, almost all the court society of Elizabeth, Catherine and Paul were buried in the small space of the Lazarevskoe cemetery".

The remains of a number of famous figures in Russian history were reburied in the cemetery during the Soviet period, among whom were architect Jean-François Thomas de Thomon, mathematician Leonhard Euler and engineer Agustín de Betancourt.

Burials and monuments

Notes

References

Cemeteries in Saint Petersburg

Cemeteries in the Alexander Nevsky Lavra